Rawson may refer to:

Places
Rawson, Chubut, the capital of Chubut Province, Argentina
Rawson Department, Chubut, Argentina
Rawson Department, San Juan, Argentina
Villa Krause, also named Rawson, the capital city of the department
Rawson, Victoria, Australia
Rawson, North Dakota, United States
Rawson, Ohio, United States

Other uses 
Rawson (surname)
 Rawson Stakes, a horse race in Australia
 a barley variety
 a boarding house at Cranbrook School in Sydney, Australia